State Highway 38 (SH 38) is a State Highway in Kerala, India that starts in Puthiyangadi and ends in Chovva. The highway is107;km long.

The Route Map 
Puthiyangadi – Ulliyeri – Perambra – Kuttiyadi – Nadapuram – Peringathur – Mekkunnu -Panoor – Koothuparamba – Chovva bypass

See also 
Roads in Kerala
List of State Highways in Kerala

References 

State Highways in Kerala
Roads in Kannur district
Roads in Kozhikode district